Dragon Ball Z: Bojack Unbound, known in Japan as , is a 1993 Japanese animated science fantasy martial arts film and the ninth Dragon Ball Z feature film. It was released in Japan on July 10 at the Toei Anime Fair, where it was shown alongside Dr. Slump and Arale-chan: N-cha! From Penguin Village with Love and the first Yu Yu Hakusho film. The antagonist Bojack was created by Takao Koyama and was designed by series creator Akira Toriyama. The film is the last to feature Kōhei Miyauchi as Master Roshi, who died two years after its release.

Plot 

A wealthy family hosts an intergalactic martial arts tournament on Earth in which fighters from across the galaxy compete including Gohan, Piccolo, Future Trunks, Tien Shinhan, Yamcha, and Krillin. All but Yamcha effortlessly advance much to the concern of Mr. Satan who recognizes them from the battle against Cell and knows he will need to face whichever one of them wins. In the semifinals, Trunks fights Tien and defeats him and Piccolo is annoyed by the lack of challenge and forfeits against Krillin. Gohan, Trunks, and Krillin advance to the finals where they each battle an alien fighter. However, as the alien fighters are revealed, the fight promoter realizes that these are not the staged, fake aliens that he recruited for the event. Trunks is challenged by a sword welding alien warrior named Gokua, Krillin is defeated by a female alien named Zangya, Gohan confronts the mysterious alien Bujin, and another tournament contestant Doskoi is killed by the alien fighter Bido. Meanwhile, having been complaining of fake stomach pain to avoid fighting, Mr. Satan gets trapped in a transportation pod and sent to the battlefield.

Trunks is surprised by his alien opponent's lethality and is forced to transform into a Super Saiyan to kill him. Trunks is then struck down by an unknown foe while Gohan continues his fight with Bujin until he discovers Trunks and Krillin have been incapacitated. Bojack arrives and tells Gohan about his plans to conquer the universe. Tien and Yamcha join the fight but are quickly defeated by Bojack's minions. Gohan fights them as Bojack watches on in amusement. While in the Other World, Goku and King Kai watch the battle with concern. King Kai reveals that centuries prior, the galactic warlord Bojack had been sealed inside of a star by all four Kais, but when Cell exploded on King Kai's planet, this allowed Bojack to become unbound.

Gohan is overwhelmed by the trio of minions and is nearly killed by Bojack until Piccolo saves him. Piccolo challenges Bojack but is quickly defeated. Trunks also challenges Bojack but is paralyzed by Bujin's energy absorption technique and nearly impaled by Bido's spear before he is saved by the surprise arrival of Vegeta. Bojack pummels Vegeta and assumes his "full power" form while Trunks is overwhelmed by Bojack's minions. With Vegeta, Trunks, and everyone else incapacitated, Gohan fights Bojack alone but is paralyzed by the combined energy absorption techniques of his minions. Gohan is attacked by Bojack but the sudden arrival of Mr. Satan's incoming pod distracts them. Gohan prepares to fight once again but is struck down by Bojack and his minions as Goku watches on helplessly as his son is captured in a bear hug and tortured.

Against the rules of Other World, Goku abruptly uses his instantaneous movement technique to transport himself to the fight and strikes Bojack before he can kill Gohan. After some advice and reassurance, Goku places his son on the ground safely and vanishes. Gohan, reinvigorated by his father's words, transforms into his Super Saiyan 2 form. Now unaffected by their attacks, Gohan effortlessly kills Bido and Bujin and Zangya is killed when Bojack blasts her toward Gohan. Bojack is impaled through the abdomen by Gohan's fist and as a last resort, he powers up a massive energy blast which Gohan counters with a Kamehameha wave. The energy beams clash and Bojack is killed. Gohan, exhausted, falls in delight as Goku praises his son from Other World. After the battle, the warriors and their friends laugh as they watch the news from the hospital that Mr. Satan is the one who defeated the alien intruders. On the roof, Vegeta and Piccolo sit, unimpressed by the cheerful tidings.

Cast

Music 
OP (Opening Theme):
 "Cha-La Head-Cha-La"
 Lyrics by Yukinojō Mori
 Music by Chiho Kiyooka
 Arranged by Kenji Yamamoto
 Performed by Hironobu Kageyama
ED (Ending Theme):
 
 Lyrics by Dai Satō
 Music by Chiho Kiyooka
 Arranged by Kenji Yamamoto
 Performed by Hironobu Kageyama

English dub soundtrack 
The score for the Funimation English dub was composed by Mark Menza. The Double Feature release contains an alternate audio track containing the English dub with original Japanese background music by Shunsuke Kikuchi, an opening theme of "Cha-La Head-Cha-La", and an ending theme of "Beyond Galaxies Rising High".

Box office 
At the Japanese box office, the film sold  tickets and grossed .

Releases 
It was released on DVD and VHS in North America on August 17, 2004. It was later released in Double Feature set along with Super Android 13! (1992) for Blu-ray and DVD on February 10, 2009, both feature full 1080p format in HD remastered 16:9 aspect ratio and an enhanced 5.1 surround mix. The film was re-released to DVD in remastered thinpak collection on December 6, 2011, containing the second 4 Dragon Ball Z films.

Reception

Other companies 
A third English version, produced and released exclusively in Malaysia by Speedy Video, features an unknown cast.

References

External links 

 Official anime website of Toei Animation
 Bojack Unbound Guide
 Pojo's Dragonball Z – Bojack Unbound script
 
 

1993 films
1993 anime films
Bojack Unbound
Funimation
Martial arts tournament films
Films directed by Yoshihiro Ueda
Toei Animation films
Films scored by Shunsuke Kikuchi